Woman Within may refer to:

 A clothing line produced by the company Fullbeauty Brands
 The Woman Within, the autobiography of Ellen Glasgow
 Woman Within, a sister organization to ManKind Project